Hanukkah is a Jewish festival commemorating the recovery of Jerusalem and subsequent rededication of the Second Temple at the beginning of the Maccabean Revolt against the Seleucid Empire in the 2nd century BCE.

Hanukkah is observed for eight nights and days, starting on the 25th day of Kislev according to the Hebrew calendar, which may occur at any time from late November to late December in the Gregorian calendar. The festival is observed by lighting the candles of a candelabrum with nine branches, commonly called a menorah or hanukkiah. One branch is typically placed above or below the others and its candle is used to light the other eight candles. This unique candle is called the shammash ("attendant"). Each night, one additional candle is lit by the shammash until all eight candles are lit together on the final night of the festival. Other Hanukkah festivities include singing Hanukkah songs, playing the game of dreidel and eating oil-based foods, such as latkes and sufganiyot, and dairy foods. Since the 1970s, the worldwide Chabad Hasidic movement has initiated public menorah lightings in open public places in many countries.

Originally instituted as a feast "in the manner of Sukkot (Booths)", it does not come with the corresponding obligations, and is therefore a relatively minor holiday in strictly religious terms.  Nevertheless, Hanukkah has attained major cultural significance in North America and elsewhere, especially among secular Jews, due to often occurring around the same time as Christmas during the holiday season.

Etymology 
The name "Hanukkah" derives from the Hebrew verb "", meaning "to dedicate". On Hanukkah, the Maccabean Jews regained control of Jerusalem and rededicated the Temple.

Many homiletical explanations have been given for the name:
 The name can be broken down into , "[they] rested [on the] twenty-fifth", referring to the fact that the Jews ceased fighting on the 25th day of Kislev, the day on which the holiday begins.
  , from the same root, is the name for Jewish education, emphasizing ethical training and discipline.
  (Hanukkah) is also the Hebrew acronym for  – "Eight candles, and the halakha is like the House of Hillel". This is a reference to the disagreement between two rabbinical schools of thought – the House of Hillel and the House of Shammai – on the proper order in which to light the Hanukkah flames. Shammai opined that eight candles should be lit on the first night, seven on the second night, and so on down to one on the last night (because the miracle was greatest on the first day). Hillel argued in favor of starting with one candle and lighting an additional one every night, up to eight on the eighth night (because the miracle grew in greatness each day). Jewish law adopted the position of Hillel.
 Psalm 30 is called , the "Song of ", The Song of the "Dedication" of the House", and is traditionally recited on Hanukkah. 25 (of Kislev) + 5 (Books of Torah) = 30, which is the number of the song.

Alternative spellings 

The spelling Hanukkah, which is based on using characters of the English alphabet as symbols to re-create the word's correct spelling in Hebrew, is the most common and the preferred choice of Merriam–Webster, Collins English Dictionary, the Oxford Style Manual, and the style guides of The New York Times and The Guardian. The sound represented by Ch (similar to the Scottish pronunciation of loch) is not native to the English language, although it is native to the Welsh language. Furthermore, the letter ḥeth, which is the first letter in the Hebrew spelling, is pronounced differently in modern Hebrew (voiceless uvular fricative) from in classical Hebrew (voiceless pharyngeal fricative ), and neither of those sounds is unambiguously representable in English spelling. However, its original sound is closer to the English H than to the Scottish Ch, and Hanukkah more accurately represents the spelling in the Hebrew alphabet. Moreover, the 'kaf' consonant is geminate in classical (but not modern) Hebrew. Adapting the classical Hebrew pronunciation with the geminate and pharyngeal  can lead to the spelling Hanukkah, while adapting the modern Hebrew pronunciation with no gemination and uvular  leads to the spelling .

Festival of Lights 
In Modern Hebrew, Hanukkah may also be called the Festival of Lights, based on a comment by Josephus in Antiquities of the Jews, καὶ ἐξ ἐκείνου μέχρι τοῦ δεῦρο τὴν ἑορτὴν ἄγομεν καλοῦντες αὐτὴν φῶτα "And from then on we celebrate this festival, and we call it Lights". The first Hebrew translation of Antiquities (1864) used "Festival of Lamps", but the translation "Festival of Lights" appeared by the end of the nineteenth century.

Historical sources

Books of Maccabees 
The story of Hanukkah is preserved in the books of the First and Second Maccabees, which describe in detail the rededication of the Temple in Jerusalem and the lighting of the menorah. These books, however, are not a part of the canonized Masoretic Text version of the Tanakh (Hebrew and Aramaic language Jewish Bible) used and accepted by normative Rabbinical Judaism and therefore modern Jews (as copied, edited and distributed by a group of Jews known as the Masoretes between the 7th and 10th centuries of the Common Era). However, the books of Maccabees were included among the deuterocanonical books added to the Septuagint, a Jewish scholarly Greek-language translation of the Hebrew Bible originally compiled in the mid-3rd century BCE. The Roman Catholic and Orthodox Churches consider the books of Maccabees as a canonical part of the Old Testament. 

The eight-day rededication of the temple is described in 1 Maccabees, though the miracle of the oil does not appear here. A story similar in character, and older in date, is the one alluded to in 2 Maccabees according to which the relighting of the altar fire by Nehemiah was due to a miracle which occurred on the 25th of Kislev, and which appears to be given as the reason for the selection of the same date for the rededication of the altar by Judah Maccabee. The above account in 1 Maccabees, as well as 2 Maccabees portrays the feast as a delayed observation of the eight-day Feast of Booths (Sukkot); similarly 2 Maccabees explains the length of the feast as "in the manner of the Feast of Booths".

Early rabbinic sources 

Megillat Taanit (1st century) contains a list of festive days on which fasting or eulogizing is forbidden. It specifies, "On the 25th of [Kislev] is Hanukkah of eight days, and one is not to eulogize" and then references the story of the rededication of the Temple.

The Mishna (late 2nd century) mentions Hanukkah in several places, but never describes its laws in detail and never mentions any aspect of the history behind it. To explain the Mishna's lack of a systematic discussion of Hanukkah, Rav Nissim Gaon postulated that information on the holiday was so commonplace that the Mishna felt no need to explain it. Modern scholar Reuvein Margolies suggests that as the Mishnah was redacted after the Bar Kochba revolt, its editors were reluctant to include explicit discussion of a holiday celebrating another relatively recent revolt against a foreign ruler, for fear of antagonizing the Romans.

The miracle of the one-day supply of oil miraculously lasting eight days is described in the Talmud, committed to writing about 600 years after the events described in the books of Maccabees. The Talmud says that after the forces of Antiochus IV had been driven from the Temple, the Maccabees discovered that almost all of the ritual olive oil had been profaned. They found only a single container that was still sealed by the High Priest, with enough oil to keep the menorah in the Temple lit for a single day. They used this, yet it burned for eight days (the time it took to have new oil pressed and made ready).

The Talmud presents three options:
 The law requires only one light each night per household,
 A better practice is to light one light each night for each member of the household
 The most preferred practice is to vary the number of lights each night.

Except in times of danger, the lights were to be placed outside one's door, on the opposite side of the mezuza, or in the window closest to the street. Rashi, in a note to Shabbat 21b, says their purpose is to publicize the miracle. The blessings for Hanukkah lights are discussed in tractate Succah, p. 46a.

Megillat Antiochus (probably composed in the 2nd century) concludes with the following words:

The Al HaNissim prayer is recited on Hanukkah as an addition to the Amidah prayer, which was formalized in the late 1st century. Al HaNissim describes the history of the holiday as follows:

In the days of Mattiyahu ben Yohanan, high priest, the Hasmonean and his sons, when the evil Greek kingdom stood up against Your people Israel, to cause them to forget Your Torah and abandon the ways You desire – You, in Your great mercy, stood up for them in their time of trouble; You fought their fight, You judged their judgment, You took their revenge; You delivered the mighty into the hands of the weak, the many into the hands of the few, the impure into the hands of the pure, the evil into the hands of the righteous, the sinners into the hands of those who engaged in Your Torah; You made yourself a great and holy name in Your world, and for Your people Israel You made great redemption and salvation as this very day. And then Your sons came to the inner chamber of Your house, and cleared Your Temple, and purified Your sanctuary, and lit candles in Your holy courtyards, and established eight days of Hanukkah for thanksgiving and praise to Your holy name.

Narrative of Josephus 
The Jewish historian Titus Flavius Josephus narrates in his book, Jewish Antiquities XII, how the victorious Judas Maccabeus ordered lavish yearly eight-day festivities after rededicating the Temple in Jerusalem that had been profaned by Antiochus IV Epiphanes. Josephus does not say the festival was called Hanukkah but rather the "Festival of Lights":

Now Judas celebrated the festival of the restoration of the sacrifices of the temple for eight days, and omitted no sort of pleasures thereon; but he feasted them upon very rich and splendid sacrifices; and he honored God, and delighted them by hymns and psalms. Nay, they were so very glad at the revival of their customs, when, after a long time of intermission, they unexpectedly had regained the freedom of their worship, that they made it a law for their posterity, that they should keep a festival, on account of the restoration of their temple worship, for eight days. And from that time to this we celebrate this festival, and call it Lights. I suppose the reason was because this liberty beyond our hopes appeared to us; and that thence was the name given to that festival. Judas also rebuilt the walls round about the city, and reared towers of great height against the incursions of enemies, and set guards therein. He also fortified the city Bethsura, that it might serve as a citadel against any distresses that might come from our enemies.

Other ancient sources 

In the New Testament, John 10:22–23 says, "Then came the Festival of Dedication at Jerusalem. It was winter, and Jesus was in the temple courts walking in Solomon's Colonnade" (NIV). The Greek noun used appears in the neuter plural as "the renewals" or "the consecrations". The same root appears in 2 Esdras 6:16 in the Septuagint to refer specifically to Hanukkah. This Greek word was chosen because the Hebrew word for 'consecration' or 'dedication' is Hanukkah. The Aramaic New Testament uses the Aramaic word  (a close synonym), which literally means 'renewal' or 'to make new'.

Story

Background 

After the death of Alexander the Great in 323 BCE, Judea became part of the Ptolemaic Kingdom of Egypt until 200 BCE, when King Antiochus III the Great of Syria defeated King Ptolemy V Epiphanes of Egypt at the Battle of Panium. Judea then became part of the Seleucid Empire of Syria. King Antiochus III the Great, wanting to conciliate his new Jewish subjects, guaranteed their right to "live according to their ancestral customs" and to continue to practice their religion in the Temple of Jerusalem. However, in 175 BCE, Antiochus IV Epiphanes, the son of Antiochus III, invaded Judea, at the request of the sons of Tobias. The Tobiads, who led the Hellenizing Jewish faction in Jerusalem, were expelled to Syria around 170 BCE when the high priest Onias and his pro-Egyptian faction wrested control from them. The exiled Tobiads lobbied Antiochus IV Epiphanes to recapture Jerusalem. As Flavius Josephus relates:

Traditional view 

When the Second Temple in Jerusalem was looted and services stopped, Judaism was outlawed. In 167 BCE, Antiochus ordered an altar to Zeus erected in the Temple. He banned brit milah (circumcision) and ordered pigs to be sacrificed at the altar of the temple.

Antiochus's actions provoked a large-scale revolt. Mattathias (Mattityahu), a Jewish priest, and his five sons Jochanan, Simeon, Eleazar, Jonathan, and Judah led a rebellion against Antiochus. It started with Mattathias killing first a Jew who wanted to comply with Antiochus's order to sacrifice to Zeus, and then a Greek official who was to enforce the government's behest (1 Mac. 2, 24–25). Judah became known as Yehuda HaMakabi ("Judah the Hammer"). By 166 BCE, Mattathias had died, and Judah took his place as leader. By 164 BCE, the Jewish revolt against the Seleucid monarchy was successful. The Temple was liberated and rededicated. The festival of Hanukkah was instituted to celebrate this event. Judah ordered the Temple to be cleansed, a new altar to be built in place of the polluted one and new holy vessels to be made. According to the Talmud,"For when the Greeks entered the Sanctuary, they defiled all the oils therein, and when the Hasmonean dynasty prevailed against and defeated them, they made search and found only one cruse of oil which lay with the seal of the kohen gadol (high priest), but which contained sufficient [oil] for one day's lighting only;  yet a miracle was wrought therein, and they lit [the lamp] therewith for eight days.  The following year these [days] were appointed a Festival with [the recital of] Hallel and thanksgiving."
—Shabbat 21b

Tertiary sources in the Jewish tradition make reference to this account.

The 12th century scholar Maimonides, known for correcting certain of Aristotle's errors by reference to the Hebrew bible, and subsequently introducing Aristotelianism to both the Jewish world and to the Christian scholastics, described Hanukkah thus in the Mishneh Torah, his authoritative 14 volume compendium on Jewish law:
When, on the twenty-fifth of Kislev, the Jews had emerged victorious over their foes and destroyed them, they re-entered the Temple where they found only one jar of pure oil, enough to be lit for only a single day; yet they used it for lighting the required set of lamps for eight days, until they managed to press olives and produce pure oil.  Because of this, the sages of that generation ruled that the eight days beginning with the twenty-fifth of Kislev should be observed as days of rejoicing and praising the Lord. Lamps are lit in the evening over the doors of the homes, on each of the eight nights, so as to display the miracle. These days are called Hanukkah, when it is forbidden to lament or to fast, just as it is on the days of Purim. Lighting the lamps during the eight days of Hanukkah is a religious duty imposed by the sages.

Academic sources 
Some modern scholars, following the account in 2 Maccabees, observe that the king was intervening in an internal civil war between the Maccabean Jews and the Hellenized Jews in Jerusalem. These competed violently over who would be the High Priest, with traditionalists with Hebrew/Aramaic names like Onias contesting with Hellenizing High Priests with Greek names like Jason and Menelaus. In particular, Jason's Hellenistic reforms would prove to be a decisive factor leading to eventual conflict within the ranks of Judaism. Other authors point to possible socioeconomic reasons in addition to the religious reasons behind the civil war.

What began in many respects as a civil war escalated when the Hellenistic kingdom of Syria sided with the Hellenizing Jews in their conflict with the traditionalists. As the conflict escalated, Antiochus took the side of the Hellenizers by prohibiting the religious practices the traditionalists had rallied around. This may explain why the king, in a total departure from Seleucid practice in all other places and times, banned a traditional religion.

The miracle of the oil is widely regarded as a legend and its authenticity has been questioned since the Middle Ages. However, given the famous question Rabbi Yosef Karo posed concerning why Hanukkah is celebrated for eight days when the miracle was only for seven days (since there was enough oil for one day), it was clear that he believed it was a historical event. This belief has been adopted by most of Orthodox Judaism, in as much as Rabbi Karo's Shulchan Aruch is a main Code of Jewish Law. The menorah first began to be used as a symbol of Judaism in the Hasmonean period – appearing on coins issued by Hasmonean king Mattathias Antigonus between 40 and 37 BCE – indicating that the tradition of an oil miracle was known then.

Timeline 

 198 BCE: Armies of the Seleucid King Antiochus III (Antiochus the Great) oust Ptolemy V from Judea and Samaria.
 175 BCE: Antiochus IV (Epiphanes) ascends the Seleucid throne.
 168 BCE: Under the reign of Antiochus IV, the second Temple is looted, Jews are massacred, and Judaism is outlawed.
 167 BCE: Antiochus orders an altar to Zeus erected in the Temple. Mattathias and his five sons John, Simon, Eleazar, Jonathan, and Judah lead a rebellion against Antiochus. Judah becomes known as Judah Maccabee ("Judah the Hammer").
 166 BCE: Mattathias dies, and Judah takes his place as leader. The Hasmonean Jewish Kingdom begins; It lasts until 63 BCE.
 164 BCE: The Jewish revolt against the Seleucid monarchy is successful in recapturing the Temple, which is liberated and rededicated (Hanukkah).
 142 BCE: Re-establishment of the Second Jewish Commonwealth. The Seleucids recognize Jewish autonomy. The Seleucid kings have a formal overlordship, which the Hasmoneans acknowledge. This inaugurates a period of population growth and religious, cultural and social development. This includes the conquest of the areas now covered by Transjordan, Samaria, Galilee, and Idumea (also known as Edom), and the forced conversion of Idumeans to the Jewish religion, including circumcision.
 139 BCE: The Roman Senate recognizes Jewish autonomy.
 134 BCE: Antiochus VII Sidetes besieges Jerusalem. The Jews under John Hyrcanus become Seleucid vassals but retain religious autonomy.
 129 BCE: Antiochus VII dies. The Hasmonean Jewish Kingdom throws off Syrian rule completely.
 96 BCE: Beginning of an eight-year civil war between Sadducee king Alexander Yanai and the Pharisees.
 85–82 BCE: Consolidation of the Kingdom in territory east of the Jordan River.
 63 BCE: The Hasmonean Jewish Kingdom comes to an end because of a rivalry between the brothers Aristobulus II and Hyrcanus II, both of whom appeal to the Roman Republic to intervene and settle the power struggle on their behalf. The Roman general Gnaeus Pompeius Magnus (Pompey the Great) is dispatched to the area. Twelve thousand Jews are massacred in the Roman Siege of Jerusalem. The Priests of the Temple are struck down at the Altar. Rome annexes Judea.

Battles of the Maccabean Revolt 

Selected battles between the Maccabees and the Seleucid Syrian-Greeks:
 Battle with Apollonius and Battle with Seron: Judas Maccabeus defeats two smaller Seleucid detachments.
 Battle of Emmaus: Judas Maccabeus performs a daring night march to make a surprise attack on the Seleucid camp while the Seleucid forces are split.
 Battle of Beth Zur: Judas Maccabeus defeats the army of Lysias, and captures Jerusalem soon after.  Lysias relents and repeals Antiochus IV's anti-Jewish decrees.
 Battle of Beth Zechariah: The Seleucids defeat the Maccabees.  Eleazar Avaran, another of Mattathias's sons, is killed in battle by a war elephant.  
 Battle of Adasa: Judas defeats the forces of Nicanor after killing him early in the battle.
 Battle of Elasa: Judas dies in battle against the army of Bacchides.  He is succeeded by his brother Jonathan Apphus, and eventually their other brother Simon Thassi, as leader of the rebellion.  The Seleucids re-establish control of the cities for 8 years, but eventually make deals with the Maccabees and appoint their leaders as official Seleucid governors and generals in a vassal-like status before eventual independence.

Characters and heroes 

 Matityahu the Priest, also referred to as Mattathias and Mattathias ben Johanan. Matityahu was a Jewish priest who, together with his five sons, played a central role in the story of Hanukkah.
 Judah the Maccabee, also referred to as Judas Maccabeus and Y'hudhah HaMakabi. Judah was the eldest son of Matityahu and is acclaimed as one of the greatest warriors in Jewish history alongside Joshua, Gideon, and David.
 Eleazar the Maccabee, also referred to as Eleazar Avaran, Eleazar Maccabeus and Eleazar Hachorani/Choran.
 Simon the Maccabee, also referred to as Simon Maccabeus and Simon Thassi.
 Johanan the Maccabee, also referred to as Johanan Maccabeus and John Gaddi.
 Jonathan the Maccabee, also referred to as Jonathan Apphus.
 Antiochus IV Epiphanes. Seleucid king controlling the region during this period.
 Judith. Acclaimed for her heroism in the assassination of Holofernes.
 Hannah and her seven sons. Arrested, tortured and killed one by one, by Antiochus IV Epiphanes for refusing to bow to an idol.

Rituals 

Hanukkah is celebrated with a series of rituals that are performed every day throughout the eight-day holiday, some are family-based and others communal. There are special additions to the daily prayer service, and a section is added to the blessing after meals.

Hanukkah is not a "Sabbath-like" holiday, and there is no obligation to refrain from activities that are forbidden on the Sabbath, as specified in the Shulkhan Arukh. Adherents go to work as usual but may leave early in order to be home to kindle the lights at nightfall. There is no religious reason for schools to be closed, although in Israel schools close from the second day for the whole week of Hanukkah. Many families exchange gifts each night, such as books or games, and "Hanukkah Gelt" is often given to children. Fried foods (such as latkes (potato pancakes), jelly doughnuts (sufganiyot), and Sephardic bimuelos) are eaten to commemorate the importance of oil during the celebration of Hanukkah. Some also have a custom of eating dairy products to remember Judith and how she overcame Holofernes by feeding him cheese, which made him thirsty, and giving him wine to drink. When Holofernes became very drunk, Judith cut off his head.

Kindling the Hanukkah lights 

Each night throughout the eight-day holiday, a candle or oil-based light is lit. As a universally practiced "beautification" (hiddur mitzvah) of the mitzvah, the number of lights lit is increased by one each night. An extra light called a shammash, meaning "attendant" or "sexton," is also lit each night, and is given a distinct location, usually higher, lower, or to the side of the others.

Among Ashkenazim the tendency is for every male member of the household (and in many families, girls as well) to light a full set of lights each night, while among Sephardim the prevalent custom is to have one set of lights for the entire household.

The purpose of the shammash is to adhere to the prohibition, specified in the Talmud, against using the Hanukkah lights for anything other than publicizing and meditating on the Hanukkah miracle. This differs from Sabbath candles which are meant to be used for illumination and lighting. Hence, if one were to need extra illumination on Hanukkah, the shammash candle would be available, and one would avoid using the prohibited lights. Some, especially Ashkenazim, light the shammash candle first and then use it to light the others. So altogether, including the shammash, two lights are lit on the first night, three on the second and so on, ending with nine on the last night, for a total of 44 (36, excluding the shammash). It is Sephardic custom not to light the shammash first and use it to light the rest. Instead, the shammash candle is the last to be lit, and a different candle or a match is used to light all the candles. Some Hasidic Jews follow this Sephardic custom as well.

The lights can be candles or oil lamps. Electric lights are sometimes used and are acceptable in places where open flame is not permitted, such as a hospital room, or for the very elderly and infirm; however, those who permit reciting a blessing over electric lamps only allow it if it is incandescent and battery operated (an incandescent flashlight would be acceptable for this purpose), while a blessing may not be recited over a plug-in menorah or lamp. Most Jewish homes have a special candelabrum referred to as either a Chanukiah (the modern Israeli term) or a menorah (the traditional name, simply Hebrew for 'lamp'). Many families use an oil lamp (traditionally filled with olive oil) for Hanukkah. Like the candle Chanukiah, it has eight wicks to light plus the additional shammash light.

In the United States, Hanukkah became a more visible festival in the public sphere from the 1970s when Rabbi Menachem M. Schneerson called for public awareness and observance of the festival and encouraged the lighting of public menorahs. Diane Ashton attributed the increased visibility and reinvention of Hanukkah by some of the American Jewish community as a way to adapt to American life, re-inventing the festival in "the language of individualism and personal conscience derived from both Protestantism and the Enlightenment".

The reason for the Hanukkah lights is not for the "lighting of the house within", but rather for the "illumination of the house without," so that passersby should see it and be reminded of the holiday's miracle (i.e. that the sole cruse of pure oil found which held enough oil to burn for one night actually burned for eight nights). Accordingly, lamps are set up at a prominent window or near the door leading to the street. It is customary amongst some Ashkenazi Jews to have a separate menorah for each family member (customs vary), whereas most Sephardi Jews light one for the whole household. Only when there was danger of antisemitic persecution were lamps supposed to be hidden from public view, as was the case in Persia under the rule of the Zoroastrians, or in parts of Europe before and during World War II. However, most Hasidic groups light lamps near an inside doorway, not necessarily in public view. According to this tradition, the lamps are placed on the opposite side from the mezuzah, so people passing through the door are surrounded by the holiness of mitzvot (the commandments).

Generally, women are exempt in Jewish law from time-bound positive commandments, although the Talmud requires that women engage in the mitzvah of lighting Hanukkah candles "for they too were involved in the miracle."

Candle-lighting time 

Hanukkah lights should usually burn for at least half an hour after it gets dark. Many light at sundown and those who do so should be careful to have enough oil or wax to last until half an hour after dark. Most Hasidim and many other communities light later, generally around nightfall. Many Hasidic Rebbes light much later to fulfill the obligation of publicizing the miracle by the presence of their Hasidim when they kindle the lights.

Inexpensive small wax candles sold for Hanukkah burn for approximately half an hour so should be lit no earlier than nightfall. Friday night presents a problem, however. Since candles may not be lit on Shabbat itself, the candles must be lit before sunset. However, they must remain lit through the lighting of the Shabbat candles. Therefore, the Hanukkah menorah is lit first with larger candles than usual, followed by the Shabbat candles. At the end of the Shabbat, there are those who light the Hanukkah lights before Havdalah and those who make Havdalah before the lighting Hanukkah lights.

If for whatever reason one didn't light at sunset or nightfall, the lights should be kindled later, as long as there are people in the streets. Later than that, the lights should still be kindled, but the blessings should be recited only if there is at least somebody else awake in the house and present at the lighting of the Hannukah lights.

Blessings over the candles 

Typically two blessings (brachot; singular: brachah) are recited during this eight-day festival when lighting the candles. On the first night only, the shehecheyanu blessing is added, making a total of three blessings.

The first blessing is recited before the candles are lit, and while most recite the other blessing(s) beforehand as well, some have the custom to recite them after. On the first night of Hanukkah one light (candle or oil) is lit on the right side of the menorah, on the following night a second light is placed to the left of the first but it is lit first, and so on, proceeding from placing candles right to left but lighting them from left to right over the eight nights.

Blessing for lighting the candles 

Transliteration: 

Translation: "Blessed are You,  our God, King of the universe, Who has sanctified us with His commandments and commanded us to kindle the Hanukkah light[s]."

Blessing for the miracles of Hanukkah 

Transliteration: 

Translation: "Blessed are You, LORD our God, King of the universe, Who performed miracles for our ancestors in those days at this time..."

Hanerot Halalu 
After the lights are kindled the hymn Hanerot Halalu is recited. There are several different versions; the version presented here is recited in many Ashkenazic communities:

Maoz Tzur 

In the Ashkenazi tradition, each night after the lighting of the candles, the hymn Ma'oz Tzur is sung. The song contains six stanzas. The first and last deal with general themes of divine salvation, and the middle four deal with events of persecution in Jewish history, praising God for survival despite these tragedies (the exodus from Egypt, the Babylonian captivity, the miracle of the holiday of Purim, the Hasmonean victory) and expressing a longing for the days when Judea will finally triumph over Rome.

The song was composed in the thirteenth century by a poet only known through the acrostic found in the first letters of the original five stanzas of the song: Mordechai. The familiar tune is most probably a derivation of a German Protestant church hymn or a popular folk song.

Other customs 
After lighting the candles and Ma'oz Tzur, singing other Hanukkah songs is customary in many Jewish homes. Some Hasidic and Sephardi Jews recite Psalms, such as Psalm 30, Psalm 67, and Psalm 91. In North America and in Israel it is common to exchange presents or give children presents at this time. In addition, many families encourage their children to give tzedakah (charity) in lieu of presents for themselves.

Special additions to daily prayers 

An addition is made to the "hoda'ah" (thanksgiving) benediction in the Amidah (thrice-daily prayers), called Al HaNissim ("On/about the Miracles"). This addition refers to the victory achieved over the Syrians by the Hasmonean Mattathias and his sons.

The same prayer is added to the grace after meals. In addition, the Hallel (praise) Psalms are sung during each morning service and the Tachanun penitential prayers are omitted.

The Torah is read every day in the shacharit morning services in synagogue, on the first day beginning from Numbers 6:22 (according to some customs, Numbers 7:1), and the last day ending with Numbers 8:4. Since Hanukkah lasts eight days it includes at least one, and sometimes two, Jewish Sabbaths (Saturdays). The weekly Torah portion for the first Sabbath is almost always Miketz, telling of Joseph's dream and his enslavement in Egypt. The Haftarah reading for the first Sabbath Hanukkah is Zechariah 2:14 – Zechariah 4:7. When there is a second Sabbath on Hanukkah, the Haftarah reading is from 1 Kings 7:40–50.

The Hanukkah menorah is also kindled daily in the synagogue, at night with the blessings and in the morning without the blessings.

The menorah is not lit during Shabbat, but rather prior to the beginning of Shabbat as described above and not at all during the day.
During the Middle Ages "Megillat Antiochus" was read in the Italian synagogues on Hanukkah just as the Book of Esther is read on Purim. It still forms part of the liturgy of the Yemenite Jews.

Zot Hanukkah 
The last day of Hanukkah is known by some as Zot Hanukkah and by others as Chanukat HaMizbeach, from the verse read on this day in the synagogue Numbers 7:84, Zot Hanukkat Hamizbe'ach: "This was the dedication of the altar". According to the teachings of Kabbalah and Hasidism, this day is the final "seal" of the High Holiday season of Yom Kippur and is considered a time to repent out of love for God. In this spirit, many Hasidic Jews wish each other Gmar chatimah tovah ("may you be sealed totally for good"), a traditional greeting for the Yom Kippur season. It is taught in Hasidic and Kabbalistic literature that this day is particularly auspicious for the fulfillment of prayers.

Other related laws and customs 
It is customary for women not to work for at least the first half-hour of the candles' burning, and some have the custom not to work for the entire time of burning. It is also forbidden to fast or to eulogize during Hanukkah.

Hanukkah as the end of the High Holy Days
Some Hasidic scholars teach that the Hanukkah is in fact the final conclusion of God's judgement extending High Holy Days of Rosh Hashana when humanity is judged and Yom Kippur when the judgment is sealed:

Hassidic masters quote from Kabbalistic sources that the God's mercy extends even further, giving the Children of Israel till the final day of Chanukah (known as "Zot Chanukah" based on words which appear in the Torah reading of that day), to return to Him and receive a favorable judgment. They see several hints to this in different verses. One is Isaiah 27:9: "Through this (zot) will Jacob's sin be forgiven" – i.e., on account of the holiness of Zot Chanukah.

Customs

Music 

A large number of songs have been written on Hanukkah themes, perhaps more so than for any other Jewish holiday. Some of the best known are "Ma'oz Tzur" (Rock of Ages), "Latke'le Latke'le" (Yiddish song about cooking Latkes), "Hanukkiah Li Yesh" ("I Have a Hanukkah Menorah"), "Ocho Kandelikas" ("Eight Little Candles"), "Kad Katan" ("A Small Jug"), "S'vivon Sov Sov Sov" ("Dreidel, Spin and Spin"), "Haneirot Halolu" ("These Candles which we light"), "Mi Yimalel" ("Who can Retell") and "Ner Li, Ner Li" ("I have a Candle"). Among the most well known songs in English-speaking countries are "Dreidel, Dreidel, Dreidel" and "Oh Chanukah".

Among the Rebbes of the Nadvorna Hasidic dynasty, it is customary for the Rebbes to play violin after the menorah is lit.

Penina Moise's Hannukah Hymn published in the 1842 Hymns Written for the Use of Hebrew Congregations was instrumental in the beginning of Americanization of Hanukkah.

Foods 

There is a custom of eating foods fried or baked in oil (preferably olive oil) to commemorate the miracle of a small flask of oil keeping the Second Temple's Menorah alight for eight days. Traditional foods include potato pancakes, known as latkes in Yiddish, especially among Ashkenazi families. Sephardi, Polish, and Israeli families eat jam-filled doughnuts ( pontshkes), bimuelos (fritters) and sufganiyot which are deep-fried in oil. Italkim and Hungarian Jews traditionally eat cheese pancakes known as "cassola" or "cheese latkes".

Latkes are not popular in Israel, having been largely replaced by sufganiyot due to local economic factors, convenience and the influence of trade unions. Bakeries in Israel have popularized many new types of fillings for sufganiyot besides the traditional strawberry jelly filling, including chocolate cream, vanilla cream, caramel, cappuccino and others. In recent years, downsized, "mini" sufganiyot containing half the calories of the regular, 400-to-600-calorie version, have become popular.

Rabbinic literature also records a tradition of eating cheese and other dairy products during Hanukkah. This custom, as mentioned above, commemorates the heroism of Judith during the Babylonian captivity of the Jews and reminds us that women also played an important role in the events of Hanukkah. The deuterocanonical book of Judith (Yehudit or Yehudis in Hebrew), which is not part of the Tanakh, records that Holofernes, an Assyrian general, had surrounded the village of Bethulia as part of his campaign to conquer Judea. After intense fighting, the water supply of the Jews was cut off and the situation became desperate. Judith, a pious widow, told the city leaders that she had a plan to save the city. Judith went to the Assyrian camps and pretended to surrender. She met Holofernes, who was smitten by her beauty. She went back to his tent with him, where she plied him with cheese and wine. When he fell into a drunken sleep, Judith beheaded him and escaped from the camp, taking the severed head with her (the beheading of Holofernes by Judith has historically been a popular theme in art). When Holofernes' soldiers found his corpse, they were overcome with fear; the Jews, on the other hand, were emboldened and launched a successful counterattack. The town was saved, and the Assyrians defeated.

Roast goose has historically been a traditional Hanukkah food among Eastern European and American Jews, although the custom has declined in recent decades.

Indian Jews traditionally consume gulab jamun, fried dough balls soaked in a sweet syrup, similar to teiglach or bimuelos, as part of their Hanukkah celebrations. Italian Jews eat fried chicken, cassola (a ricotta cheese latke almost similar to a cheesecake), and fritelle de riso par Hanukkah (a fried sweet rice pancake). Romanian Jews eat pasta latkes as a traditional Hanukkah dish, and Syrian Jews consume Kibbet Yatkeen, a dish made with pumpkin and bulgur wheat similar to latkes, as well as their own version of keftes de prasa spiced with allspice and cinnamon.

Dreidel 

After lighting the candles, it is customary to play (or spin) the dreidel. The dreidel, or sevivon in Hebrew, is a four-sided spinning top that children play with during Hanukkah. Each side is imprinted with a Hebrew letter which is an abbreviation for the Hebrew words  ("A great miracle happened there"), referring to the miracle of the oil that took place in the Beit Hamikdash. The fourth side of some dreidels sold in Israel are inscribed with the letter  (Pe), rendering the acronym  ("A great miracle happened here"), referring to the fact that the miracle occurred in the land of Israel, although this is a relatively recent innovation. Stores in Haredi neighborhoods sell the traditional Shin dreidels as well, because they understand "there" to refer to the Temple and not the entire Land of Israel, and because the Hasidic Masters ascribe significance to the traditional letters.

Hanukkah gelt 

Chanukkah gelt (Yiddish for "Chanukkah money"), known in Israel by the Hebrew translation , is often distributed to children during the festival of Hanukkah. The giving of Hanukkah gelt also adds to the holiday excitement. The amount is usually in small coins, although grandparents or relatives may give larger sums. The tradition of giving Chanukah gelt dates back to a long-standing East European custom of children presenting their teachers with a small sum of money at this time of year as a token of gratitude. One minhag favors the fifth night of Hanukkah for giving Hanukkah gelt. Unlike the other nights of Hanukkah, the fifth does not ever fall on the Shabbat, hence never conflicting with the Halachic injunction against handling money on the Shabbat.

Hanukkah in the White House 

The United States has a history of recognizing and celebrating Hanukkah in a number of ways. The earliest Hanukkah link with the White House occurred in 1951 when Israeli Prime Minister David Ben-Gurion presented United States President Harry Truman with a Hanukkah Menorah. In 1979 president Jimmy Carter took part in the first public Hanukkah candle-lighting ceremony of the National Menorah held across the White House lawn. In 1989, President George H. W. Bush displayed a menorah in the White House. In 1993, President Bill Clinton invited a group of schoolchildren to the Oval Office for a small ceremony.

The United States Postal Service has released several Hanukkah-themed postage stamps. In 1996, the United States Postal Service (USPS) issued a 32 cent Hanukkah stamp as a joint issue with Israel. In 2004, after eight years of reissuing the menorah design, the USPS issued a dreidel design for the Hanukkah stamp. The dreidel design was used through 2008. In 2009 a Hanukkah stamp was issued with a design featured a photograph of a menorah with nine lit candles. In 2008, President George W. Bush held an official Hanukkah reception in the White House where he linked the occasion to the 1951 gift by using that menorah for the ceremony, with a grandson of Ben-Gurion and a grandson of Truman lighting the candles.

In December 2014, two Hanukkah celebrations were held at the White House. The White House commissioned a menorah made by students at the Max Rayne school in Israel and invited two of its students to join U.S. President Barack Obama and First Lady Michelle Obama as they welcomed over 500 guests to the celebration. The students' school in Israel had been subjected to arson by extremists. President Obama said these "students teach us an important lesson for this time in our history. The light of hope must outlast the fires of hate. That's what the Hanukkah story teaches us. It's what our young people can teach us – that one act of faith can make a miracle, that love is stronger than hate, that peace can triumph over conflict." Rabbi Angela Warnick Buchdahl, in leading prayers at the ceremony commented on the how special the scene was, asking the President if he believed America's founding fathers could possibly have pictured that a female Asian-American rabbi would one day be at the White House leading Jewish prayers in front of the African-American president.

Dates 

The dates of Hanukkah are determined by the Hebrew calendar. Hanukkah begins at the 25th day of Kislev and concludes on the second or third day of Tevet (Kislev can have 29 or 30 days). The Jewish day begins at sunset. Hanukkah dates for recent and upcoming:

 
 
 
 
 
 
 
 

In 2013, on 28 November, the American holiday of Thanksgiving fell during Hanukkah for only the third time since Thanksgiving was declared a national holiday by President Abraham Lincoln. The last time was 1899; and due to the Gregorian and Jewish calendars being slightly out of sync with each other, it will not happen again in the foreseeable future. This convergence prompted the creation of the neologism Thanksgivukkah.

Symbolic importance 

Major Jewish holidays are those when all forms of work are forbidden, and that feature traditional holiday meals, kiddush, holiday candle-lighting, etc. Only biblical holidays fit these criteria, and Chanukah was instituted some two centuries after the Hebrew Bible was completed. Nevertheless, though Chanukah is of rabbinic origin, it is traditionally celebrated in a major and very public fashion. The requirement to position the menorah, or Chanukiah, at the door or window, symbolizes the desire to give the Chanukah miracle a high-profile.

Some Jewish historians suggest a different explanation for the rabbinic reluctance to laud the militarism. First, the rabbis wrote after Hasmonean leaders had led Judea into Rome's grip and so may not have wanted to offer the family much praise. Second, they clearly wanted to promote a sense of dependence on God, urging Jews to look toward the divine for protection. They likely feared inciting Jews to another revolt that might end in disaster, as the Bar Kochba revolt did.

With the advent of Zionism and the state of Israel, however, these themes were reconsidered. In modern Israel, the national and military aspects of Hanukkah became, once again, more dominant.
While Hanukkah is a relatively minor Jewish holiday, as indicated by the lack of religious restrictions on work other than a few minutes after lighting the candles, in North America, Hanukkah in the 21st century has taken a place equal to Passover as a symbol of Jewish identity. Both the Israeli and North American versions of Hanukkah emphasize resistance, focusing on some combination of national liberation and religious freedom as the defining meaning of the holiday.

Some Jews in North America and Israel have taken up environmental concerns in relation to Hanukkah's "miracle of the oil", emphasizing reflection on energy conservation and energy independence. An example of this is the Coalition on the Environment and Jewish Life's renewable energy campaign.

Relationship to Christmas 

In the Catholic Church, Christmastide has its own Octave, being eight days especially set aside to celebrate Christmas from December 25th to January 1st. This is seen as a Christian fulfillment of the original text's demand for Hanukkah to be eight days, "And they kept the eight days with gladness, as in the feast of the tabernacles, remembering that not long afore they had held the feast of the tabernacles" (2 Macc 10:6). Advent is considered as the season of darkness preceding the season of light, Christmas, so for this reason, Christmas can be said to be the "New Hanukkah," or its fulfillment through the Nativity of Christ. This is similar to the Easter Octave being the solemn eight days of the Passover of Exodus.

In North America, Hanukkah became increasingly important to many Jewish individuals and families during the latter part of the 20th century, including a large number of secular Jews, who wanted to celebrate a Jewish alternative to the Christmas celebrations which frequently overlap with Hanukkah. Diane Ashton argues that Jewish immigrants to America raised the profile of Hanukkah as a kid-centered alternative to Christmas as early as the 1800s. This in parts mirrors the ascendancy of Christmas, which like Hanukkah increased in importance in the 1800s. During this time period, Jewish leaders (especially Reform) such as Max Lilienthal and Isaac Mayer Wise made an effort to rebrand Hanukkah and started creating Hanukkah celebration for kids at their synagogues, which included candy and singing songs. By the 1900s, it started to become a commercial holiday like Christmas, with Hanukkah gifts and decorations appearing in stores and Jewish Women's magazines printing articles on holiday decorations, children's celebrations, and gift giving. Ashton says that Jewish families did this in order to maintain a Jewish identity which is distinct from mainline Christian culture, on the other hand, the mirroring of Hanukkah and Christmas made Jewish families and kids feel that they were American. Though it was traditional for Ashkenazi Jews to give "gelt" or money to children during Hanukkah, in many families, this tradition has been supplemented with the giving of other gifts so that Jewish children can enjoy receiving gifts just like their Christmas-celebrating peers do. Children play a big role in Hanukkah, and Jewish families with children are more likely to celebrate it than childless Jewish families, and sociologists hypothesize that this is because Jewish parents do not want their kids to be alienated from their non-Jewish peers who celebrate Christmas. Recent celebrations have also seen the presence of the Hanukkah bush, which is considered a Jewish counterpart to the Christmas tree. Today, the presence of Hanukkah bushes is generally discouraged by most rabbis, but some Reform, Reconstructionist and more liberal Conservative rabbis do not object, they also do not object to the presence of Christmas trees.

Relationship to Kwanzaa 
In December 2022, New York City Mayor Eric Adams, Reverends Al Sharpton and Conrad Tillard, businessman Robert F. Smith, Rabbi Shmuley Boteach, and Elisha Wiesel joined to celebrate Hanukkah and Kwanzaa together, and combat racism and antisemitism, at Carnegie Hall.

See also

 Jewish greetings
 Jewish holidays

Footnotes

References

Further reading

External links

 Hanukah – Story and Art Activities.
 Hanukkah  at About.com
 Hanukkah at the History channel
 Hanukkah at the Jewish Encyclopedia
 Hanukkah  at the Jewish Agency for Israel
 Hanukkah at Chabad.org
 Hanukkah at Aish HaTorah
 

 
Cultural depictions of the Maccabees
Kislev observances
Tevet observances
Traditions involving fire